Geraldine Houser ( Moffat; born 5 September 1939) is a British former film and television actress and the mother of video game producers Sam and Dan Houser.

Selected filmography 
 The Man Who Had Power Over Women (1970) – Lydia Blake
 Get Carter (1971) – Glenda
 Quest for Love (1971) – Stella
 The Last Chapter (1974) – Carlotta

Television appearances 
 The Baron (1966, "Time to Kill") – Cristina Vitale
 Pardon The Expression (1966, episode "Big Hotel") – Samantha
 Danger Man (1966, episode "Someone is Liable to Get Hurt") – Magda Kallai
 Adam Adamant Lives! (1966) – Prudence
 The Gamblers (1967, episode "Read 'em and Weep") – Judith
 Out of the Unknown (1969, episode "The Little Black Bag") – Angie
 Department S (1969, pilot episode "Six Days") – Janet
 Strange Report (1969) – Tessa O'Neill
 Z-Cars (1968–1970) – Karen Dunn / Kathy Egerton
 UFO (1970) – Jean Regan
 The Persuaders! (1971) – Senka
 Jason King (1972) – Claudia
 The Protectors (1973, episode "Goodbye George") – Maria Milworth
 Father Brown (1974) – Elizabeth Barnes
 The New Avengers (1976) – Jo
 Within These Walls (1975–1976) – Aileen Cruddley
 The Sweeney (1976) – Sheila Martin
 Coronation Street (1973–1980) – Arlene Jones / Vicki

Video game appearances 
 Grand Theft Auto V (2013) – Mrs Philips (Uncredited)

References

External links 
 

1939 births
Living people
British film actresses
Actors from Nottingham
People educated at West Bridgford School
British television actresses
Actresses from Nottinghamshire